Robert Davis Daniel (born June 11, 1997) is an American professional baseball pitcher in the Los Angeles Angels organization. He is currently a phantom ballplayer, having spent two days on the Angels’ active roster without making an appearance.

Amateur career
Daniel attended Saint James School in Montgomery, Alabama. He committed to play college baseball at North Carolina State University as a sophomore, but later switched his commitment to Auburn University. In 2016, as a senior, he went 11–1 with a 0.70 ERA and 137 strikeouts over seventy innings. He was selected by the Chicago Cubs in the 34th round of the 2016 Major League Baseball draft, but did not sign and enrolled at Auburn.

In 2017, Daniel's freshman year at Auburn, he appeared in 17 games (making 16 starts) in which he went 4–3 with a 5.89 ERA over  innings. The next season, he pitched  innings, striking out seventy batters and pitching to a 4.86 ERA. Following the season's end, he was selected by the Milwaukee Brewers in the 11th round of the 2018 Major League Baseball draft but did not sign. That summer, he played collegiate summer baseball with the Chatham Anglers of the Cape Cod Baseball League. As a junior in 2019, Daniel was Auburn's Opening Night starter and pitched two innings before being removed with an arm injury that eventually required Tommy John surgery and forced him to miss the remainder of the season.

Professional career
Daniel was selected by the Los Angeles Angels in the seventh round of the 2019 Major League Baseball draft, and signed. He did not play in 2019 after signing, and did not play a game in 2020 due to cancellation of the minor league season caused by the COVID-19 pandemic. He made his professional debut in 2021 with the Tri-City Dust Devils of the High-A West and was promoted to the Rocket City Trash Pandas of the Double-A South in late June. In early September, he was promoted to the Salt Lake Bees of the Triple-A West. Over 23 games (22 starts) between the three teams, Daniel went 4–7 with a 3.92 ERA and 154 strikeouts over  innings. He returned to Salt Lake to begin the 2022 season.

On June 11, 2022, the Angels selected Daniel's contract and promoted him to the major leagues. He was optioned back to Salt Lake two days later without making an appearance. He played in the minor leagues with Salt Lake the remainder of the season, going 6-7 with a 4.49 ERA and 83 strikeouts over  innings.

On February 16, 2023, Daniel was placed on the 60-day injured list with a right shoulder strain.

References

External links

Minor league baseball players
1997 births
Living people
Baseball pitchers
Baseball players from Alabama
Sportspeople from Montgomery, Alabama
Auburn Tigers baseball players
Chatham Anglers players
Tri-City Dust Devils players
Rocket City Trash Pandas players
Salt Lake Bees players